The 2010 PBZ Zagreb Indoors was an ATP men's tennis tournament played on hard courts indoors. It was the 5th edition of the Zagreb Indoors, and was part of the ATP World Tour 250 series of the 2010 ATP World Tour. It took place in Zagreb, Croatia from 1 February through 7 February 2010. First-seeded Marin Čilić won the singles title.

ATP entrants

Seeds

 Rankings are as of January 18, 2010

Other entrants
The following players received wildcards into the singles main draw:
  Ivan Dodig
  Petar Jelenić
  Antonio Veić

The following players received entry from the qualifying draw:
  Ruben Bemelmans
  Ilija Bozoljac
  Alexandre Sidorenko
  Andreas Vinciguerra

Finals

Singles

 Marin Čilić defeated  Michael Berrer, 6–4, 6–7(5–7), 6–3
It was Cilic's second title of the year and 5th of his career. It was his second win at the event, also winning in 2009.

Doubles

 Jürgen Melzer /  Philipp Petzschner defeated  Arnaud Clément /  Olivier Rochus, 3–6, 6–3, [10–8]

External links
ATP tournament profile
Official website
Singles draw
Doubles draw

Zagreb Indoors
PBZ Zagreb Indoors
Pbz Zagreb Indoors, 2010
2010s in Zagreb
Sports competitions in Zagreb
February 2010 sports events in Europe